Tinani (Tinan) is a Sino-Tibetan language spoken in the Indian state of Himachal Pradesh and in western Tibet.

Tinani is spoken in the lower Chandra, Tinan, and Rangloi valleys of Lahaul and Spiti district in Himachal Pradesh (Ethnologue). Gondhla is main village.

References

Bibliography

Languages of Himachal Pradesh
West Himalayish languages
Endangered languages of India